Goli Jan (also Romanized as Golī Jān; also known as Kalījār) is a village in Goli Jan Rural District, in the Central District of Tonekabon County, Mazandaran Province, Iran. At the 2006 census, its population was 406, in 119 families.

References 

Populated places in Tonekabon County